The Dutch Eredivisie in the 1963–64 season was contested by 16 teams. DWS (just promoted to the Eredivisie this year) won the championship.

League standings

Results

See also 
 Eerste Divisie 1963–64
 Tweede Divisie 1963–64

References

External links 
 Eredivisie official website - info on all seasons 
 RSSSF
 Wildstat.com

Eredivisie seasons
Netherlands
1963–64 in Dutch football